FSV Gütersloh 2009 (Frauensportverein, e.g. Women's Sports Club) is a German women's football club from Gütersloh. It currently competes in the 2. Bundesliga.

It has its origin in the women's team of FC Gütersloh, which was founded in 1984. In 2001 it reached the 2. Bundesliga. They were relegated two years later, but they returned and in 2006 FC Gütersloh was the category's runner-up, their best performance to date. In 2009 the team decided to separate from FC Gütersloh and become an independent club, and adopted its current name.

Players

Current squad

References

External links

Women's football clubs in Germany
Football clubs in North Rhine-Westphalia
Association football clubs established in 1984
Association football clubs established in 2009
Gütersloh
1984 establishments in West Germany
2009 establishments in Germany
Frauen-Bundesliga clubs